Rhytiphora argenteolateralis is a species of beetle in the family Cerambycidae. It was described by McKeown in 1948.

References

argenteolateralis
Beetles described in 1948